The Haveli District is one of the 10 districts of Pakistan's dependent territory of Azad Kashmir. It was previously a tehsil of the Bagh District but was elevated to district status on 1 July 2009.

According to the 2017 census, the district has a population of 152,124. The main native languages are Pahari (estimated to be spoken by around 65% of the inhabitants), Gujari ( 30%), and Kashmiri ( 5%).

Administration
The Haveli District is divided into three tehsils:

 Haveli Tehsil
 Khurshidabad Tehsil
 Mumtazabad Tehsil

The district has 12 union councils consisting of 95 villages and one municipal corporation, Forward Kahuta.

Geography
The Haveli District is situated at a high altitude of approximately 8,000 feet above sea level. Heavy snowfall occurs regularly throughout the year. Darra Haji Peer, Lasdana, Sindhgala, Neel Kunth, Aliabad, Sheraziabad, Kalamula, Jabbi Syedan, and Mohri Syed Ali are all well known tourist locations.  The Bedori Top, at 12,228 feet, is the highest peak in the district.*Many people from the district have migrated abroad, and some of them serve in key positions in Pakistan.  The Haveli District is bounded on the north and north-east by the Baramulla District of Indian-administered Jammu and Kashmir, on the south-east and south by the Poonch District of Indian-administered Jammu and Kashmir, and on the west by the Bagh District and the Poonch District of Azad Kashmir.

Education 
According to the Alif Ailaan Pakistan District Education Rankings 2017, the Haveli District is ranked 33 out of 148 districts in education. For facilities and infrastructure, the district is ranked 146 out of 148.

References

[[Category:Haveli District| ]]
Districts of Azad Kashmir